Carlos Sotelo García (born 8 October 1961) is a Mexican politician affiliated with the PRD. He served as Senator of the LX and LXI Legislatures of the Mexican Congress representing Colima, and previously served as a local deputy in the L Legislature of the Congress of Colima.

References

1961 births
Living people
Politicians from the State of Mexico
Members of the Senate of the Republic (Mexico)
Members of the Congress of Colima
Party of the Democratic Revolution politicians
20th-century Mexican politicians
21st-century Mexican politicians